Trinasus or Trinasos, or Trinassus or Trinassos (Τρίνασσος), was a town and fortress of ancient Laconia, situated upon a promontory near the head of the Laconian Gulf, and 30 stadia above Gythium. It is opposite to three small rocks, which gave their name to the place. The modern village is for the same reason still called Trinisa (Τὰ Τρίνησα). There are considerable remains of the ancient walls.

References

Populated places in ancient Laconia
Former populated places in Greece
Ancient Greek archaeological sites in Greece